GovernmentRisk360 is a methodology designed to systematically capture the range of government related risk factors at play in an Australian domestic context. It was developed by and launched by FPL Advisory, a regulatory affairs firm specialising in supporting corporate, public sector, non-profit and membership association clients in managing their interactions and activity with government.

The methodology uses a series of indicators to analyse an organisation or project’s exposure to uncertainties in government decision-making, to provide an overall risk profile to inform strategic decisions. It is applied in a range of contexts for a variety of users including Corporate Affairs and Executive personnel assessing business or organisation structures in the context of government engagement activity, public sector organisations assessing opportunities and challenges for successful program or project delivery and non-for-profit organisations seeking to better position their offering to secure government funding.

The methodology classes indicators under six categories including three external categories to assess changes in the general environment, and three internal categories which assess activities within the organisation’s control.

Categories 
The GovernmentRisk360 methodology includes six categories of risk:
 External Risks
 Political Risk assessing changes in the political landscape, focused on matters such as electoral cycles, government stability and other localised political events.
 Regulatory Risk where a change in government regulation creates new conditions on operations (such as packaging or promotion restrictions).
 Operational Risk where a shift in government focus or policy disrupt business inputs (such as energy policy settings) required for normal business operations.
 Internal Risks
 Reputation Risk where an organisation’s actions impact on their licence to operate and hamper their ability to engage with government stakeholders.
 Compliance Risk created through an organisation’s or industry’s failure to address or enforce critical compliance criteria which could trigger an escalated government policy or regulatory response.
 Opportunity Risk where an organisation has limited visibility or influence of government stakeholders, relationships, institutions, or policy settings and so are unable to realise opportunities.

Each of the categories has a range of indicators that form the methodology. The relative importance and prevalence of the indicators varies depends on the company, industry, program and environment. For example, in the lead up to any relevant jurisdiction’s election, aspects of Political Risk just as changing government and/or responsible Minister may be more relevant than in between election cycles.

Applications 
The methodology applies to any industry or sector and there are often commonalities across sectors or similar organisations:
 Political Risk – Queensland Coal vs Climate Jobs Narrative - In the 2019 Federal election, the Labor Party suffered a 4% swing against them in Queensland, largely attributed to the perceived threat to jobs associated with Labor’s position on the Adani Coal mine. The mine was commonly believed to be creating around 10,000 jobs. Queensland is also facing significant tourism job losses associated with coral bleaching. The Great Barrier Reef is estimated to contribute more than 64,000 jobs and the impacts on the economy from those job losses creates a future political dilemma. This creates a high political risk associated with potential change in government and/or policy focus area on job creation for both sectors, but particularly for tourism operators in Queensland who may be anticipating government action in this space.
 Opportunity Risk – Coordinated Industry Approaches – a common opportunity risk presents where an industry does not collectively act in response to growing sentiment and creates a situation of possible political intervention. For example, in the case of Tasmanian Salmon fishing, there is growing public disapproval centred on the ‘red’ rating and a Parliamentary inquiry. The industry is well connected and carries significant political weight as a major employer, but this profile and rapport may only have limited runway particularly in the event of a significant environmental issue and/or through reputation erosion during the Inquiry as outlined above. There is opportunity for the industry to demonstrate leadership in collectively managing a limited resource and providing an industry led solution to government to address ongoing overcrowding. This could be achieved through partnership efforts such as the collaboration between the Salmon Enterprises of Tasmania and CSIRO that aimed to address stock losses.

Use and Limitations 
The GovernmentRisk360 methodology is used by organisations to assess their profile or specific projects through a number of tools to assess government risk which provide reporting inputs to broader risk management and government engagement planning.

The methodology can be used in decision-making situations to inform risk management before further actions are taken and to guide deployment of resources. GovernmentRisk360 may also be used in long term strategic planning to inform business goals and objectives with respect to government activities.

GovernmentRisk360 was designed with an Australian domestic focus and is limited to firms and organisations currently or potentially operating in Australia.

External links 
 Official Website
 GovernmentRisk360 developed by FPL Advisory Pty Ltd

References 

Risk management
Politics of Australia
Financial risk modeling